Timothy Aaron Young (born February 6, 1976) is an American former professional basketball player.

Young, a seven-foot center, played collegiately at Stanford University and was selected in the 1999 NBA Draft by the Golden State Warriors with the 27th pick of the second round (56th overall). He lasted 25 games with the Warriors in the 1999-2000 NBA season, averaging 2.2 points and 1.4 rebounds.

Young went to Harbor High School in Santa Cruz.

NBA career statistics

Regular season 

|-
| style="text-align:left;"| 1999–00
| style="text-align:left;"| Golden State
| 25 || 0 || 5.5 || .333 || .000 || .778 || 1.4 || .2 || .1 || .0 || 2.2
|- class="sortbottom"
| style="text-align:left;"| Career
| style="text-align:left;"|
| 25 || 0 || 5.5 || .333 || .000 || .778 || 1.4 || .2 || .1 || .0 || 2.2

External links
 
College & NBA stats @ basketball-reference.com
NBA Draft '99 @ sportsillustrated.cnn.com
Scouting report @ ibiblio.org

1976 births
Living people
American expatriate basketball people in Poland
American expatriate basketball people in Spain
American men's basketball players
Baloncesto León players
Basketball players from California
Cantabria Baloncesto players
Centers (basketball)
Gijón Baloncesto players
Golden State Warriors draft picks
Golden State Warriors players
Polonia Warszawa (basketball) players
Sportspeople from Santa Cruz, California
Stal Ostrów Wielkopolski players
Stanford Cardinal men's basketball players